Wife-beater, wifebeater, and wife beater  may refer to:
 a type of sleeveless shirt
 a person who abuses their wife
 a nickname for certain alcoholic drinks:
 Rum, made from sugarcane, sometimes called "the golden wifebeater" 
 Stella Artois, a beer sometimes called "Wife Beater" in the UK
 Matt Prince, (born 1973) a professional wrestler whose ring name is Wifebeater
 Chris Spradlin, (born 1979) a professional wrestler whose former ring name was Wife Beater
 Sickie Wifebeater, stage name of The Mentors' guitarist Eric Carls (born 1958)
 Wife Beater (EP), an EP by the metalcore band The Plot in You